Joris van Overeem (born 1 June 1994) is a Dutch professional footballer who plays as a midfielder for Israeli Premier League club Maccabi Tel Aviv.

Club career
Van Overeem joined Dutch youth side AZ in 2006.

AZ Alkmaar
On 30 October 2013, he made his senior debut for AZ in the KNVB Cup against Achilles '29; substituting Jeffrey Gouweleeuw in the 69' minute and scoring the last goal in the 88' minute; in a home match that ended in a 7–0 win.

Dordrecht
On 9 August 2014, he made his senior debut in the Eredivisie and for Dordrecht against Heerenveen; in a match that ended in a 1–2 away victory, where he both opened and scored his debut senior league goal.

Maccabi Tel Aviv
On 13 June 2022, van Overeem signed a three-year contract with Israeli Premier League club Maccabi Tel Aviv.

References

External links
 Career stats & Profile - Voetbal International
 
 
 

1994 births
Living people
Jewish footballers
Footballers from Amsterdam
Association football midfielders
Dutch footballers
Israeli footballers
AZ Alkmaar players
Jong AZ players
FC Dordrecht players
FC Utrecht players
Maccabi Tel Aviv F.C. players
Eredivisie players
Israeli Premier League players
Dutch people of Israeli descent
Netherlands youth international footballers
Netherlands under-21 international footballers
Dutch people of Jewish descent
Israeli people of Dutch-Jewish descent
Dutch emigrants to Israel